Can't Fly Without Gravity is the sixth studio album by Canadian rapper k-os. The album originally was to be released on August 28, 2015 through Dine Alone Records, but was pushed back until September 4, 2015. The entire album was released over Spotify prior to its release date. The album cover is a reference to the poster of the 1983 film Vacation.

Background

Naming
In an interview with Global News on August 26, 2015, k-os indicated that the title paralleled the negativity of "haters" to the downward force of gravity. In both situations, one must deal with these forces to go beyond them. He succinctly expressed the notion saying, "the forces which pull you down are simply put there to inspire you to rise above them."

Singles

  
On August 6, 2014, the track "WiLD4TheNight (Ego Land)" was released. The song was written in Trinidad; the music video was shot there as well.

Track listing

References

2015 albums
K-os albums
Dine Alone Records albums